Planetary chauvinism is the belief that human society will always be planet-based (even if extended beyond Earth), and overlooks or ignores the potential benefits of space-based living.  The idea can be extended to alien society in general.  That is, we should expect alien society to be planet based.  The coining of the term is often credited to Isaac Asimov, but in an interview with Bill Boggs, Asimov mentions that he heard it from Carl Sagan. The counter-argument is that all the benefits of a planet can be achieved in space, usually by an O'Neill cylinder-type structure.

An even narrower version of planetary chauvinism is G-star chauvinism.  This is the assumption that intelligent life will always evolve in star systems similar to our own.  That is, in stars of spectral class G.  Carl Sargan criticised this belief on the grounds that intelligent life has a greater chance of evolving on the most long lived stars.  That suggests that class-M and class-K stars are more likely candidates, not only because of their lifetime, but also because they are far more numerous that class-G stars.

See also
 Anthropocentrism
 Carbon chauvinism
 Chauvinism
 Particle chauvinism
 Surface chauvinism and surfacism

References

Space colonization
Chauvinism
Isaac Asimov